Darb-e Gonbad Rural District is a rural district (dehestan) in Darb-e Gonbad District, Kuhdasht County, Lorestan Province, Iran. At the 2006 census, its population was 5,886, in 1,153 families.  The rural district has 19 villages.

References 

Rural Districts of Lorestan Province
Kuhdasht County